The Waco Custom Cabins were a series of up-market single-engined four-to-five-seat cabin sesquiplanes of the late 1930s produced by the Waco Aircraft Company of the United States. "Custom Cabin" was Waco's own description of the aircraft which despite minor differences, were all fabric-covered biplanes.

Design
Nearly all of the Waco Custom Cabins were powered by radial engines (there being one factory-built exception, the MGC-8) and the purchaser could specify almost any commercially available engine and Waco would build an aircraft powered by it, hence the profusion of designations, as the first letter indicates the engine installed. Some models were offered in case someone wanted a specific engine but not all were built. Fuselage structure was typical for the period, being welded steel tubing with light wood strips to fair the shape in. The wings were made of spruce with two spars each, having ailerons on only the upper wings, mounted on a false spar. Split flaps were installed on the undersides of the upper wings, though two designs were used depending on model – placed either mid-chord (OC, UC and QC), or in the conventional position at the trailing edge of the wing (GC and N). The model N was unusual in being the only model with flaps on the lower wings while the model E was the only one with plain flaps. Wing bracing was with a heavily canted N strut joining upper and lower wings, assisted by a single strut bracing the lower wing to the upper fuselage longeron, except on the E series which replaced the single strut with flying and landing wires. Elevators and rudder were aerodynamically counterbalanced and braced with wire cables. Both could be trimmed, the rudder via a ground-adjustable tab, the elevators via jack screw on the OC, UC and QC, while the GC, E and N used a single trim tab on the port (left) elevator. The main landing gear was sprung with oleo struts, and a castoring tailwheel was fitted on all versions except the VN model, which had a nosewheel.

Designation clarification
Waco had been building a series of successful cabin biplanes, when in 1935 they introduced a new series of upmarket cabin sesquiplanes intended for the wealthy private individual or business. The original biplanes had been given a designation ending in C, however with the new Custom Cabin, Waco decided to differentiate the new design and existing C types that remained in production were recoded as C-S types to indicate Standard Cabin, until Waco changed their designation again in 1936 to just an S. For example, the 1934 Standard Cabin YKC was redesignated as a YKC-S in 1935, and as a YKS-6 in 1936. 1936 also saw the adoption of a numerical suffix to indicate the model year of the design, as "-6" for 1936, "-7" for 1937, etc. Since it referred to a model and not the year of production, the "-7" was carried into 1939 for some Custom Cabins, while others were designated "-8".  In 1936, Waco started using a short form to refer to the types of aircraft without the engine and model identifiers resulting in C-6, C-7 and C-8  however as Waco only built one type of Custom cabin in each of those years, they refer to the QC-6, GC-7 and GC-8 series respectively.

Operational history
The Custom Cabin series, with its improved performance proved to be popular and many were purchased by small commercial aviation firms and non-aviation businesses. Approximately 300 Custom Cabin Wacos of all types (excluding the Waco E series and the Waco N series), were produced between 1935 and 1939. Some were employed as "executive transports". Many served in the Canadian bush country, where they normally operated on skis in winter and EDO floats in summer. Many of these Canadian Wacos were ordered and built as freighters with additional doors. In 1936 an EQC-6 operated by Speers Airways of Regina, Saskatchewan was the first non-military government operated air ambulance in Canada. 
With the onset of World War II, examples were impressed into the air forces of many Allied nations, including the US (USAAC and US Navy), the United Kingdom, South Africa, Australia and New Zealand. Most were used as utility aircraft, however a small number were operated by the US Civil Air Patrol, conducting anti-submarine patrols off the US coastline from March 1942 to August 1943 armed with 50- or 100-pound bombs. A single impressed ZGC-7 referred to as the Big Waco, RAF serial AX695, was used by the British Long Range Desert Group (LRDG) along with a Standard Cabin YKC named Little Waco to support their activities behind Axis lines. Flight Regiment 19, Finnish Air Force (Swedish Volunteer Air Force) used one Waco ZQC-6 (OH-SLA) during the Russo-Finnish Winter War in support of Finnish military operations. 
Numerous Custom Cabin series aircraft of several sub-models are currently registered in the US, and more are in under restoration. This is still a popular design among owners of classic aircraft.

Variants

The Waco Custom cabin series included all of the enlarged-cabin sesquiplanes from 1935 and can be further divided into six basic models, OC, UC QC, GC, RE and VN, with additional subtypes differing primarily in engine installation (indicated by the first letter of the designation or by a low dash number, i.e. -1, -2) and by model year (dash numbers -6, -7, -8).  Letters were not used sequentially.
Each basic type was offered with almost any engine the customer wished and designations were created accordingly, however some engines were more popular than others resulting in some types being offered, but never built. Due to the wide variety of engines already offered, it was both relatively easy and common to change the installed engine, resulting in a lot of confusion as to the correct designation to use for a specific airframe.

The RE series is more refined aerodynamically than earlier models; the wings are fully plywood-skinned, and instead of a bulky compression strut carrying lift loads, a more conventional set of streamlined flying wires completes the wing structure. It has the fastest cruise speed of any of the Waco cabin models, with a Vne of 270 mph.

1935 OC Series (54+ built)
UOC   Continental R-670-A or  Continental R-670-B engine. four built.

YOC   Jacobs L-4 engine. 50+ YOC and YOC-1 built. Built as UOC and re-engined.
YOC-1   Jacobs L-5 engine. Built as UOC and re-engined. One impressed by USAAF as UC-72N.

1935 UC Series (30+ built)
CUC   Wright R-760-E engine. 30+ built of all CUC types.
CUC-1   Wright R-760-E1 engine. Built as CUC and re-engined. One impressed by USAAF as UC-72F.
CUC-2   Wright R-760-E2 engine. Built as CUC and re-engined.

1936 QC Series (C-6) (120 built)
AQC-6   Jacobs L-6 engine. Seven built. One impressed by USAAF as UC-72G.
AQC-6 Freighter: At least two aircraft ordered through Fleet Aircraft and built for use in Canada with additional freight doors on both sides of the fuselage and equipped for floats. Engine same as for standard AQC-6. Additional aircraft may have been modified.

 
DQC-6   Wright R-760-E1 engine. 11 built.
EQC-6   Wright R-760-E2 engine. 20 built. USCG used three as J2W-1
  
  
VQC-6   Continental W-670-M1 engine. One built.
YQC-6   Jacobs L-4 engine. 13 built. One ex-RAAF example re-engined with ;hp DeHavilland Gypsy 6 inline engine.
ZQC-6   Jacobs L-5 engine. 68 built. One impressed by the USAAF as UC-72Q and five as UC-72H.; Swedish AF Tp-8a
ZQC-6 Freighter: At least eight aircraft ordered through Fleet Aircraft and built for use in Canada with additional freight doors on both sides of the fuselage and equipped for floats. Engine same as for standard ZQC-6. Additional aircraft may have been modified.

1937–38 GC Series (C-7 and C-8) (96+ built)

AGC-8   Jacobs L-6 engine. 17 built, two modified to EGC-8. Two impressed by USAAF as UC-72P.
DGC-7   Wright R-760-E1 engine. Two built.
EGC-7   Wright R-760-E2 engine. 38 built.
EGC-8  same as EGC-7 for 1938. Seven built, plus two modified from AGC-8, and one used to trial   Menasco C-6S-4 for MGC-8. Four impressed by USAAF as UC-72B
MGC-8  Menasco Buccaneer inline engine. One modified, unknown number built.
  
  
  
  
ZGC-7   Jacobs L-5 engine. 28 built. Four impressed by USAAF as UC-72E
ZGC-8  same as ZGC-7 for 1938, four built.

1938 VN Series (N-8) (20 ca. built)

AVN-8   Jacobs L-6 engine.
ZVN-8   Jacobs L-5 engine.

1939 RE Series (30 built)

ARE Aristocrat   Jacobs L-6 (four built, one impressed by USAAF as UC-72A)
HRE Aristocrat   Lycoming R-680-E3 (five built, two impressed by USAAF as UC-72C)
SRE Aristocrat   Pratt & Whitney Wasp Jr SB-2/-3 (21 built, 13 impressed by USAAF as UC-72)

Military designations
A-54  Royal Australian Air Force designation for impressed YQC-6

Tp-8a  Swedish Air Force designation for ZQC-6. Tp-8 was a generic designation for all Wacos.

J2W  US Coast Guard designation for three EQC-6 bought from Waco. Additional aircraft impressed by the US Navy were undesignated.

UC-72/C-72  US Army Air Forces designation for impressed Custom Cabin series Wacos.

{|
|-
| UC-72B ||  :  || EGC-8 ||align=right|   four impressed
|-
| UC-72E ||  :  || ZGC-7 ||align=right|   four impressed
|-
| UC-72P ||  :  || AGC-8 ||align=right|   two impressed
|-
| UC-72Q ||  :  || ZQC-6 ||align=right|   one impressed
|-
| UC-72G ||  :  || AQC-6 ||align=right|   one impressed
|-
| UC-72H ||  :  || ZQC-6 ||align=right|   five impressed
|-
| UC-72F ||  :  || CUC-1 ||align=right|   one impressed
|}

Operators

Civil operators
Wacos were used in small numbers by a very large number of individual operators in many countries.

Military operators
Most operators operated either a single example, or a very small number.

Argentine Navy (EQC-6 and UOC)

Royal Australian Air Force impressed (YQC-6)

Exército Brasileiro (30 EGC-7)

Royal Canadian Air Force impressed (AQC-6)
Department of National Defence purchased (two ZQC-6)

Finnish Air Force impressed  (ZQC-6)

Royal Netherlands Air Force possibly impressed (EGC-7)

Royal New Zealand Air Force impressed (UOC)

Nicaraguan Air Force (EGC-7)

South African Air Force impressed at least ten Wacos of different types (CUC and YOC)

Swedish Air Force (ZQC-6)

Royal Air Force impressed (ZVN-8) and ZGC-7)

United States Coast Guard (three EQC-6)
United States Navy
United States Army Air Forces (impressed 18 of various types – see above)

Aircraft on display
Aside from the large number of privately owned Wacos that continue to exist, a number have also found their way into museums.

Specifications (ZQC-6)

See also

References

Notes

Bibliography

FAA Registry Search for Waco

External links

 Data on Waco aircraft at Aerofiles.com
 FAA Registry Search for Waco
 Tp 8 and Tp 8a
 American Waco Club

Custom
1930s United States civil utility aircraft
1930s United States military transport aircraft
1930s United States military utility aircraft
Sesquiplanes
Single-engined tractor aircraft
Aircraft first flown in 1935